Tigak (or Omo) is an Austronesian language spoken by about 6,000 people (in 1991) in the Kavieng District of New Ireland Province, Papua New Guinea.

The Tigak language area includes the provincial capital, Kavieng.

Phonology
Phoneme inventory of the Tigak language:

 can also be realized as  allophonically.

Two vowels  in word-initial form can also be released as consonantal allophones .

External links 
 Paradisec includes a number of collections with Tigak language materials.

References

Meso-Melanesian languages
Languages of New Ireland Province